The 2012–13 Georgia Bulldogs basketball team represents the University of Georgia during the 2012–2013 college basketball season. The team's head coach is Mark Fox, who is in his fourth season at UGA. They play their home games at Stegeman Coliseum as members of the Southeastern Conference.

Previous season
After reaching the NCAA tournament, the Bulldogs struggled in 2011–12 by finishing the season 15–17 overall, 5–11 in conference which was good for eleventh in the SEC.

Roster

Source:

Schedule

|-
!colspan=12| Exhibition

|-
!colspan=12| Non-Conference Regular Season

|-
!colspan=12| SEC Regular Season

|-
!colspan=12| 2013 SEC tournament

|-
| colspan="12" | *Non-Conference Game. Rankings from AP poll. All times are in Eastern Time. (#) Number seeded with region.
|}

References

Georgia Bulldogs basketball seasons
Georgia Bulldogs
Bulldogs
Bulldogs